Sidh Gosti (pronunciation: , , lit. discourse with Siddhas) is a famous spiritual interfaith dialogue 
between Guru Nanak and Hindu Siddhas.

The composition is present from page 938 to 946 in Adi Granth. Composition have 73 Stanzas, written in Ramkali Raga. Prominent Sidh and Naths present during discussion were Charpatnath, Bhangarnath and Loharipa
. The popular belief is that this discourse happened at Achal Batala. Other than that Guru Nanak had discourses with Sidhas at various places mainly at Gorakhmatta, Achal Batala and Mount Meru. The discussion explains  differences of Gurmat with Yog.

Sidh Gosti is also pronounced as Sidh Goshti or Sidh Gosht or Sidh Gosat.

Content 

The discussion explains  differences of Gurmat with Yog. During the discussion with Siddhas, Guru Nanak explains that renunciation and austerities are not essential for achieving salvation. For eg: Consider the following hymns which explain the differences between the two paths.

Yogi Loharipa says

Guru Nanak responds

Yogi Loharipa says

Guru Nanak responds

See also 

 Sikhism and Hinduism

References

 Exegesis of Sidh Goshti by Dharam Singh Nihang

Adi Granth
Dialogues
Sikh literature
Hymns